Buffé is a Swedish monthly free customer magazine which is distributed to the customers of ICA, a supermarket. The company also owned Icakuriren, a weekly family magazine, until October 2014.

History and profile
Buffé was started in 1995. The magazine is published by OTW Media Group, a subsidiary of ICA, in Stockholm. It features recipes and practical information about cooking.

In 2007, the circulation of Buffé was 1,996,900 copies, making it the best-selling magazine in Sweden. The magazine sold 2,310,300 copies in 2014.

In 2013, the publisher of Buffé won the Swedish Design Awards for Magazine Design. In May 2015, the magazine also received two silver awards at Guldbladet, an award gala for the content market agencies.

References

External links
 

1995 establishments in Sweden
Food and drink magazines
Free magazines
Magazines established in 1995
Magazines published in Stockholm
Monthly magazines published in Sweden
Swedish-language magazines